Metla Rajulu, also called Metlu Rajas, ruled in Cuddapah. They were the last princely state to be captured by the British when Rayalaseema was ceded to them by the Nizam after laying siege to the fort for a couple of months. The Metla Rajulu had alliances and married off their daughter to Sada Siva Raya of the Tuluva Dynasty which helped them establish and play a prominent role during the reign of the Tuluva and Araveeti dynasties.

Matli (Metla) Varada Raju, son of Somaraja, was married to Krishnamma, the sister-in-law of Araveeti Rama Rayalu and the second daughter of Emperor Sreekrishnadevarayalu.

References 

Dynasties of India
History of Andhra Pradesh